Leo Segarra Sánchez (born 4 February 1981), more commonly known as Leo, is a Spanish singer notable for his participation in Operación Triunfo. Born in Valencia, Spain, Sánchez studied information technology and engineering. During time abroad in Norway he began to sing in public streets. He attended the auditions for Operación Triunfo where he ultimately competed, finishing third to Lorena.

Discography
Lo mejor de Leo (a collection of songs from the auditions and galas) - No. 2 SPA (40,000 copies sold; Gold)
Iniciando sesion (Debut album) - No. 7 SPA (+40,000 copies sold; Gold)
Nuevo Norte - No. 24 SPA (+24,000 copies sold; NC)

Songs on Iniciando sesion
Estar para ti
Mas amor
Lucia (duet with Manuel España)
En la ciudad
Si aun me quieres
Me sigue doliendo
Canto
Sabes que estoy pensando en ti
Se escapan mis razones (duet with Lorena)
Me pones a 100
Celos de aire

References

External links
 Official website

1981 births
Living people
Singers from the Valencian Community
Operación Triunfo contestants
21st-century Spanish singers
21st-century Spanish male singers